Valença may refer to:

People
Marquis of Valença, a Portuguese title of nobility 
Count of Valença, a Portuguese title of nobility
Alceu Valença (born 1946), a Brazilian composer
Valença (footballer) (born 1982), full name Manoel Cordeiro Valença Neto, Brazilian footballer
Rosinha de Valença (1941–2004), a Brazilian composer and musician

Places
Valença, Portugal
Valença, Bahia, Brazil
Valença Airport
Valença, Rio de Janeiro, Brazil
Valença do Piauí, Brazil

See also

Valence (disambiguation)
Valencia (disambiguation)
Valentia (disambiguation)
Valensia (Aldous Byron Valensia Clarkson, born 1971), a Dutch composer and musician
Valenza, a place in Italy